The 1897 Buffalo football team represented the University of Buffalo as an independent during the 1897 college football season. Led by C. W. Dibble in his first and only season as head coach, the team compiled a record of 9–1. Buffalo beat the Syracuse Orangemen twice during the season.

Schedule

References

Buffalo
Buffalo Bulls football seasons
Buffalo football